is a town located in Higashimorokata District, Miyazaki Prefecture, Japan.

As of October 1, 2019, the town has an estimated population of 18,717 and the density of 143 persons per km². The total area is 130.63 km².

Geography

Neighbouring municipalities 

 Miyazaki Prefecture
 Miyazaki
 Saito
 Nichinan
 Aya
 Nishimeya

References

External links

Kunitomi official website 

Towns in Miyazaki Prefecture